Seemenbach is a river of Hesse, Germany. It passes through Büdingen, and flows into the Nidder near Altenstadt.

See also
List of rivers of Hesse

References

Rivers of Hesse
Rivers of the Vogelsberg
Rivers of Germany